The Hafelekarspitze is a mountain in the so-called North Chain (Nordkette) north of Innsbruck in Austria.

Location and landscape 

Not far from there is the Hafelekar Survey Station, a cosmic radiation observatory of the University of Innsbruck, the only one of its kind in Austria. It was here in 1937 that physicists Marietta Blau and Hertha Wambacher using Nuclear emulsion plates, made the first ever observation of nuclear disintegration 'stars' (Zertrümmerungsterne) caused by cosmic rays striking nuclei in the emulsion.

Routes 
In summer, the Hafelekarspitze is the start point for mountain hikes and tours along the Goethe Way (Goetheweg) to the Gleirschspitze, the Mandlspitze, the Gleirschtaler Brandjoch saddle or to the  Rumer Spitze. At the eastern end of the Goethe Way is the Pfeis Hut north and below the Rumer Spitze, which is used as a base for the long route via the Wilde Bande-Steig to the Lafatscher Joch and the Hallerangerhaus. In winter there is a ski route from the top station to the Seegrube, the centre of the North Chain ski area.

References

External links 

 www.nordkette-austria.net – The website about the North Chain
 The Innsbruck Klettersteig

Two-thousanders of Austria
Mountains of Tyrol (state)
Karwendel
Innsbruck
Mountains of the Alps